Jerold T. Hevener (April 30, 1873, date of death unknown) was an American film actor and director.  He appeared in 36 films and directed a further 18 between 1912 and 1917. He was born in Philadelphia, Pennsylvania.

Selected filmography

As an actor

The Dream of a Moving Picture Director (1912)
 All for a Girl (1915) as Count Barony
 A Terrible Tragedy (1916)
 Edison Bugg's Invention (1916)
 Her Choice (1915)
 Matilda's Legacy (1915)
 A Lucky Strike (1915)
 Cupid's Target (1915)
 What He Forgot (1915)
 Jealous James (1914)
 A Fool There Was (1914)
 He Won a Ranch (1914)
 Building a Fire (1914)
 A Prize Package (1912)
 The Widow Casey's Return (1912)

As a director

 It Happened in Pikesville (1916)
 A Terrible Tragedy (1916)
 Edison Bugg's Invention (1916)
 The Crazy Clock Maker (1915)
 The Prize Baby (1915)
 Cupid's Target (1915)
 What He Forgot (1915)
 The Soubrette and the Simp (1914)
 The Smuggler's Daughter (1914)
 The Female Cop (1914)

External links

portraits

1873 births
Year of death missing
American male film actors
American film directors
20th-century American male actors
Male actors from Philadelphia